Gabriel Richard  (October 15, 1767 – September 13, 1832) was a French Roman Catholic priest who ministered to the French Catholics in the parish of Sainte Anne de Détroit, as well as Protestants and Native Americans living in Southeast Michigan. He established schools, a library, and vocational training with weaving looms. After Detroit was nearly destroyed by a fire in 1805, he and others created a new layout for the city. His motto following the fire, Speramus meliora; resurget cineribus ("We hope for better things; it will arise from the ashes") is inscribed on the Seal of the City of Detroit.

Richard helped negotiate the Treaty of Fort Meigs. He was co-founder of the Catholepistemiad of Michigania (which would later be renamed the University of Michigan). He was the first Catholic priest elected to the U.S. House of Representatives as delegate of the Michigan Territory for the 18th Congress. The Fr. Gabriel Richard Guild was established in 2020 as one of the first steps towards canonization of Richard.

Early life
Born in La Ville de Saintes on October 15, 1767, Gabriel Richard was the third of six children born to François Richard and Marie Geneviève Bossuet. At age 11, Gabriel was ready to receive a formal education. He was admitted into the Collège in Saintes.

Gabriel Richard struggled at first but soon became one of the school's top scholars. His grades especially improved after an accident sidelined him for a period of time.  The Collège was building a new chapel, and the building was surrounded with scaffolding.  Even though the boys were forbidden to climb it, Gabriel Richard did.  In descending, he stepped off into space.  He received a “head wound and a heavy cut in the chin and mouth.” This accident left him with a jaw that had a slight twist to the left and a permanent scar.

He entered the seminary in Angers in 1784 and was ordained on October 15, 1790. He was a priest of the Society of Saint-Sulpice, an intellectual order. Expressing the value of receiving a good education, Richard wrote his father, "I esteem education a hundred times more than the succession you could leave us, for an accident can deprive us of all our possessions, but knowledge and good education remain with us forever."

During the French Revolution, which began in the spring of 1792, revolutionary militants demanded that priests declare their allegiance to the secular French Republic. Richard refused to swear the oath and on April 2, he sailed from Le Havre on the ship named Reine des Coeurs (Queen of Hearts) for the United States. More than 200 priests were killed by revolutionary forces four months later.

He emigrated to Baltimore, Maryland. He taught mathematics at St. Mary's Seminary in Baltimore, until being assigned by Bishop Carroll to do missionary work to the Indians in the Northwest Territory. He was first stationed in what is now Kaskaskia, Illinois, and later in Detroit, Michigan.

Missionary

Richard arrived in Detroit on the Feast of Corpus Christi, which was on June 7, 1798, to be the assistant pastor at Basilica of Sainte Anne de Détroit (Sainte Anne's Church). Michael Levadoux was the pastor. Many of the people in Detroit, both Catholics and Protestants, were of France ethnicity. He acquired the name Le Bon Pere (the good father), regardless of their religion.

He traveled to distant communities. South of Detroit, he met with Catholics along Maumee Bay, and along the Raisin, Huron, Ecorse, and Rouge River areas. To the north, he ministered to those along the St. Clair and Black Rivers. And he visited Catholics along Anchor Bay, Swan Creek, L'Anse Creuse Bay on Lake St. Clair, and the Clinton River. He established the third oldest parish in Michigan along the Clinton River when he established a log chapel called St. Peter's of Mt. Clemens in 1799. The same year, he traveled north to visit the Odawa at L'Arbre Croche. Soon after, a smallpox epidemic spread through the Great Lakes region. More than one half of L'Arbre Croche settlement's residents died. The Odawa believed deaths were retributions, either because Richard's religion was evil or that the Great Spirit was angered by the possibility of the natives accepting Catholicism.

In 1801, Bishop Pierre Denaut arrived in Detroit from Quebec. He administered the Sacrament of Confirmation to 536 parishioners, of those all but 10 were of French heritage.

Richard became the pastor of the church in 1802. He gave sermons on Sundays for the church parishioners, and at some point began providing sermons for Protestants and Native Americans. With his assistant pastor, Father Jean Dilhet, he ran separate schools for girls and boys beginning in 1804 and established a library for the church. He trained four people to be teachers and provided education to local Native Americans. He also had looms delivered and taught members of the church to weave.

A fire leveled the city on June 11, 1805, including Sainte Anne's Church. This is when Gabriel Richard wrote the city of Detroit's motto: Speramus meliora; resurget cineribus; In English: "We hope for better things; it will arise from the ashes." The words are printed on the seal of the City of Detroit. Richard organized the shipment of food aid to the city from neighboring ribbon farms on both sides of the Detroit River to alleviate a food crisis following the loss of the city's supply of livestock and grain. He arranged for funding from Washington, D.C. and, with other leaders, created a new city plan for the streets in Detroit, including Jefferson and Michigan Avenues.

In 1808, Richard established a school for Native American and white children. He had the first printing press in Detroit and published a periodical in the French language entitled Essais du Michigan, as well as The Michigan Essay, or Impartial Observer, in 1809. He also printed books with the press, including reprints of books. He is said to have printed The Child's Spelling Book. He had a personal library of 240 books on history, literature, theology, philosophy, law, and science. He also had a book of the Gospel of St. John that was printed in Mohawk and English.

Richard ministered among the Indians of the region and was generally admired by them. During the War of 1812, Richard was imprisoned by the British for refusing to swear an oath of allegiance after their capture of Detroit, saying, "I have taken an oath to support the Constitution of the United States and I cannot take another. Do with me as you please." He was released when the Shawnee chief Tecumseh, despite his hatred for the Americans, refused to fight for the British while Richard was imprisoned. The Americans won the war in 1815.

Treaty of Fort Meigs
Richard helped negotiate the Treaty of Fort Meigs in which the lands of Native Americans in the Ohio River valley and the lower Great Lakes—including the Odawa, Potawatomi, and Chippewa— were ceded to the United States government. Some of the lands became the site of the University of Michigania.

University of Michigan

Together with Chief Justice Augustus B. Woodward, Richard was a co-founder of the Catholepistemiad of Michigania (which would later be renamed the University of Michigan), authorized by the legislature in 1817. He served as a professor, its vice-president, and a trustee. It was first established in Detroit and 20 years later, it was moved to Ann Arbor, Michigan.

Political career
Richard was elected as a nonvoting delegate of the Michigan Territory to the U.S. House of Representatives for the 18th Congress, and was the first Catholic priest to be elected to that body, serving a single term from March 4, 1823 to March 3, 1825. He secured the first federal appropriation for the Territorial Road across Michigan's lower peninsula; it was developed as Michigan Avenue, connecting Detroit with Chicago. He was an unsuccessful candidate for reelection in 1824 to the Nineteenth Congress.

Death

On September 13, 1832, after assisting cholera victims during an epidemic, Gabriel Richard died in Detroit. He was buried in a crypt in the chapel of Sainte Anne's and was later moved to the Fr. Gabriel Richard Chapel where it is on full display. His library was among the collection of the Sacred Heart Seminary beginning in 1925 and were presented to the University of Michigan in 1951.

In 1937, The Michigan Catholic said that Richard had a

Legacy

A bronze bust of Richard by Frank Varga marks his tomb within Sainte Anne Church.
A State of Michigan Historical Marker commemorates Richard outside Sainte Anne Church in Detroit.
A statue of Richard resides on the Detroit City Hall's exterior. It was made by Julius Melchers.
A statue of Richard is located at Mullen Park at Wayne State University.
A statue of Richard is located at Gabriel Richard Park at East Jefferson and East Grand Boulevard.
A State of Michigan Historical Marker commemorates Richard in Jonesville, Michigan for his negotiation for federal funds for the Sauk Trail, also called the Territorial Road.
 The motto that he first penned, Speramus meliora; resurget cineribus, continues to be the official motto of the City of Detroit.

There are at least four schools near Detroit named after Richard:
Gabriel Richard Catholic High School in Riverview, Michigan
Father Gabriel Richard High School in Ann Arbor, Michigan
Gabriel Richard Elementary School in Detroit
Père Gabriel Richard Elementary School in Grosse Pointe Farms, Michigan.

Canonization

The Fr. Gabriel Richard Guild was formed on September 20, 2020, as one of the first steps towards canonization of Richard. Coinciding with the announcement, Detroit's Archbishop Allen Vigneron released a statement, saying "Fr. Richard was a zealous pastor whose missionary heart guided all that he did. At a time when we in the Archdiocese are coming to a renewed awareness of our missionary vocation, I am grateful that we are able to raise up Fr. Richard as a model and inspiration for our mission today." The purpose of the guild is to determine if there is sufficient "heroic virtue or holiness worth promoting" by the church's archbishop and other bishops in Michigan.

See also
Robert Drinan, the first Roman Catholic priest to serve as a voting member of Congress

References

Bibliography

Further reading
 

 Madosky, Kevin M., Father Gabriel Richard’s Faith Development in the French Correspondence through the Optic of James Fowler’s “Stages of Faith,” Master’s thesis, Sacred Heart Major Seminary, Detroit, MI, 2022.

Deaths from cholera
Delegates to the United States House of Representatives from Michigan Territory
Michigan Independents
1767 births
1832 deaths
Regents of the University of Michigan
18th-century French Roman Catholic priests
19th-century American Roman Catholic priests
Infectious disease deaths in Michigan
American people of the War of 1812
French emigrants to the United States
19th-century American politicians
Prisoners and detainees of the British military
French prisoners and detainees